Lesa B. Roe is an American aerospace engineer and Former Acting Deputy Administrator of NASA. She served as the Chancellor of the University of North Texas System from 2017 to 2021. Most recently Solid Power Inc. named Lesa Roe to its board of directors. Solid Power develops solid-state rechargeable battery products for government and commercial markets, including aerospace and electric vehicles.

Biography 
She received her bachelor's degree in electrical engineering from the University of Florida, and her master's degree in electrical engineering from the University of Central Florida.

Prior to becoming chancellor, Roe served as the Acting Deputy Administrator of NASA from January 20, 2017, to September 30, 2017, and was the Deputy Associate Administrator from May 1, 2014, to September 30, 2017. Roe has also served as the Director of NASA Langley Research Center from 2005 to 2014, the first woman to hold that position. She previously served as the center's Deputy Director from June 2004 until being named Director in October 2005. Roe in totality served 32 years at NASA, managed the employment of over 17,000 employees with a budget of 19.6 billion.

Awards 
Roe has received many awards, including the NASA Exceptional Service Medal and YWCA Women of Distinction in Space and Technology honor.

References

Living people
University of Florida College of Engineering alumni
University of Central Florida alumni
Center Directors of NASA
Langley Research Center
Year of birth missing (living people)
George W. Bush administration personnel
Trump administration personnel
Obama administration personnel